A Picture of Katherine Mansfield is a 1973 BBC television drama series starring Vanessa Redgrave as writer Katherine Mansfield, Jeremy Brett as her second husband John Middleton Murry, and Annette Crosbie as her life-long friend Ida Baker, known as L.M. The series consists of six fifty-minute parts each including episodes of Mansfield's life interwoven with adaptations of her short stories, dramatized by English novelist, playwright, and screenwriter Robin Chapman (1933–2020).

Cast
Vanessa Redgrave as Katherine Mansfield
Jeremy Brett as John Middleton Murry
Lyndon Hughes as Josie
Annette Crosbie as L.M.
Phyllida Law as Mother
Bruce Purchase as Father
Geoffrey Burridge as Henry

Short Story Adaptations
The Mansfield short story adaptations in each of the six episodes in the series each have their own cast, and are as follows:
1 'Psychology' and 'The Garden Party'
2 'Germans at Meat' and 'Something Childish but Very Natural'
3 'Je ne parle pas francais' and 'Sun and Moon'
4 'The Aloe' and 'The Man Without a Temperament'
5 'Bliss' and 'The Daughters of the Late Colonel'
6 'At the Bay' and 'Prelude'

References

External links
 
 

BBC television dramas
1970s British television miniseries
1973 British television series debuts
1973 British television series endings
1970s British drama television series